KGT may refer to:

Kangding Airport, Sichuan Province, China, IATA code
Kilgetty railway station, Pembrokeshire, Wales, code
Kyrgyzstan Time (UTC+06:00)